Thalaha is a village development committee in Morang District in the Kosi Zone of south-eastern Nepal. At the time of the 1991 Nepal census it had a population of 7559.

Notable People
Notable people from Thalaha Kataha include Dr. Ram Ray, an Associate Professor and Researcher, who has made hundreds of publications and has made contributions to knowledge about landslide hazards.

References

Village development committees in Morang District
Katahari Rural Municipality